Charles-Étienne César Gudin de La Sablonnière (13 February 1768 – 22 August 1812) was a French general who served during the French Revolutionary Wars and the Napoleonic Wars.

Biography
Gudin was born to a noble family in Montargis, on 13 February 1768. After studying at the military school of Brienne, in October 1782 he joined the King's Guard as a gendarme. In September 1784 he entered the Régiment d'Artois with the rank of sub-lieutenant, and between January 1791 and January 1793 was stationed in the Saint-Domingue garrison as a lieutenant. Gudin was appointed to several positions as a general staff officer in the Army of the North, then of the Rhine and Moselle. He became a brigade general at the beginning of 1799 and was given a command during the Swiss campaign. The following year he took part in the battles of Stein, Stockach, Messkirch, Memmingen, Höchstädt and Neuburg. Promoted to general of division for his valor on the battlefield, on 11 July 1800 he took Füssen. That winter he commanded the 2nd division in the right wing under Lecourbe at the decisive French victory at Hohenlinden.

 
Gudin was given the command of the 3rd Division in the Grande Armée and fought in the wars of the Third Coalition and Fourth Coalition between 1805 and 1807. His 3rd Division of the III Corps was the first major formation into action at the Battle of Auerstädt and it bore the main brunt of the fighting. It suffered 40 percent casualties, one of whom was Gudin, who was seriously wounded. He participated in forcing the town of Custrin to capitulate and then playing an important part at the battles of Pultusk and Eylau. A count of the First French Empire in 1808, he was named governor of the castle of Fontainebleau the following year. He then took part in several battles of the War of the Fifth Coalition: Thann, Landshut, Eckmühl, the taking of Ratisbon. He was wounded at the bloody battle of Wagram. In 1812 he was given the command of a division of the second Grande Armée. He was struck by a cannonball during the Battle of Valutino, fighting against Russian troops near Smolensk in Russia. His leg was amputated but he developed gangrene and died three days after the battle. His heart was removed to be buried in a chapel in the Père Lachaise Cemetery, Paris.

Recovery of remains

On 6 July 2019, in a park in central Smolensk, archaeologists led by French historian Pierre Malinowski found a coffin and skeletal remains that bore signs of trauma consistent with the historical record of Gudin's death (one leg amputated and another one wounded). The find was confirmed when DNA tests from the remains found in Russia matched those of Pierre-César Gudin, Gudin's brother, who was also a Napoleonic general.

On 13 July 2021, Gudin's remains were returned to France. His coffin was officially received by the French Minister of Veterans Affairs, Geneviève Darrieussecq, with a guard of honour wearing Napoleonic uniform. Plans for a larger ceremony, however, involving French and Russian officials were cancelled amid tension between the two countries.  Gudin's remains were buried in the Hôtel des Invalides on 2 December 2021, marking the anniversary of the French victory at the Battle of Austerlitz.

Family
Gudin married Jeanne Caroline Christine Creutzer, the sister of Brigadier-General Charles Auguste Creutzer (1780–1832). His younger brother  (1775-1855) also followed a military career, reaching the rank of brigade general, and was made a Baron of the Empire by Napoleon in 1810.

Recognition 
His name appears on the Arc de Triomphe in Paris.

References

Citations

Sources

1768 births
1812 deaths
Burials at Père Lachaise Cemetery
French commanders of the Napoleonic Wars
French military personnel killed in the Napoleonic Wars
French Republican military leaders of the French Revolutionary Wars
Names inscribed under the Arc de Triomphe
People from Montargis